Francis Poipoi Leota is a New Zealand rugby league player who represented New Zealand between 1989 and 1990, including in games that counted towards the 1992 World Cup.

Early years
Leota attended De La Salle College and played rugby union until he was 20.

Playing career
Leota was an Otahuhu Leopards junior, in the Auckland Rugby League competition. He originally played on the wing until he moved into the second row in 1987. He was an Auckland representative and played in three Test matches for the New Zealand national rugby league team between 1989 and 1990. He was a New Zealand Residents representative in 1990 and 1992.

Leota played for the Sheffield Eagles between 1989 and 1991 and also represented the Salford City Reds in England.

In 1993 Leota won the Rothville Trophy for Otahuhu, which is awarded to the ARL's player of the year. Also in 1993 Leota played for Auckland and represented an Otago Invitational XIII that played the New Zealand Māori side.

In 1994 Leota played for the Waikato Cougars in the new Lion Red Cup. He played for the champion Counties Manukau Heroes in 1996.

References

Living people
New Zealand rugby league players
New Zealand national rugby league team players
Auckland rugby league team players
Otago rugby league team players
Waikato rugby league team players
Otahuhu Leopards players
Sheffield Eagles (1984) players
Salford Red Devils players
Counties Manukau rugby league team players
Rugby league wingers
Rugby league props
Rugby league second-rows
Year of birth missing (living people)